Male Lipljene is a settlement in the Municipality of Grosuplje in central Slovenia. The area is part of the historical region of Lower Carniola. The municipality is now included in the Central Slovenia Statistical Region. 

Archaeological evidence of an Iron Age and Roman period burial ground has been uncovered near the settlement.

Gallery

References

External links

Male Lipljene on Geopedia

Populated places in the Municipality of Grosuplje